Mohammadabad is a village in Howmeh Rural District, in the Central District of Khalilabad County, Razavi Khorasan Province, Iran. At the 2006 census, its population was 612, in 167 families.

References 

Populated places in Khalilabad County